Pidaung Wildlife Sanctuary is a protected area in Myanmar's Kachin State, covering  at an elevation of  in Myitkyina Township.

Between the early 1960s and 1993, its size was reduced because of the expansion of sugar cane plantations, deforestation due to security reasons, construction of roads, railways and settlements. Wildlife diminished as a result.

The sanctuary harbours the orchid species Malaxis latifolia, Arundina graminifolia, Spathoglottis affinis and Spathoglottis plicata.

References 

Protected areas of Myanmar
Protected areas established in 1927